The King Oscar export brand was founded in 1902, when King Oscar II, ruler of Norway and Sweden, gave , one of Norway's leading canning companies at the time, special royal permission to use his name and likeness on a line of sardine products.

Over the years, the King Oscar brand expanded into new markets, introduced new product lines, and was eventually acquired by several different parent companies as the sardine canning industry evolved in Norway. Today, King Oscar AS is owned by Thai Union Group, one of the largest seafood producers in the world.

History 
In 1880, Norwegian fish canneries began exporting sardines. At the World's Fair in Chicago in 1893, the Norwegian exhibition included smoked sardines.

In 1903, a year after the royal permit had been granted, Chr. Bjelland & Co. first began exporting the King Oscar brand of sardines to the United States, and by 1920, the brand was established in the US and British markets. In 1965, the company started exporting their sardines to Japan.

Chr. Bjelland & Co. produced a ten-minute film called "Sardine fishing" in 1909 to market the brand; this was the first Norwegian commercial. The company also used the slogan "Out to conquer the world".

In 1950, various King Oscar brisling sardine products were accorded kosher certification.

In 1981, eleven Norwegian canneries merged to form a single company, Norway Foods, which acquired the King Oscar brand. Norway Foods was in turn acquired by Rieber & Søn ASA in 1996. Over the following years, the brand was introduced to various European countries.

In 2008, King Oscar's central production facilities were moved to a facility in Gniewino, Poland. The company continues to maintain a production facility in Svolvær, Norway.

King Oscar AS became the new owner of the brand in 2009. The company was purchased by Procuritas Capital Investments in 2010, and by Thai Union Group in 2014.

Products 
While sardines have always been the company's flagship product, it also  produces a variety of seafood products including brisling and Baltic sardines, herring, mackerel, salmon, tuna, cod, and specialty items, as well as fish salads and fish pâtés.

References

Further reading 
 Johnsen, J. G. (2002). "Out to conquer the world". King Oscar sardiner gjennom 100 år. Stavanger: Mesi Forlag.

External links 
 

Norwegian brands
Rieber & Søn
Seafood companies of Norway
Food and drink companies established in 1902
Products introduced in 1903
Norwegian companies established in 1902
Fish processing companies